The World Trade Center site, often referred to as "Ground Zero" or "the Pile" immediately after the September 11 attacks, is a 14.6-acre (5.9 ha) area in Lower Manhattan in New York City. The site is bounded by Vesey Street to the north, the West Side Highway to the west, Liberty Street to the south, and Church Street to the east. The Port Authority of New York and New Jersey (PANYNJ) owns the site's land (except for 7 World Trade Center). The original World Trade Center complex stood on the site until it was destroyed in the September 11 attacks.

The Port Authority, Silverstein Properties, and the Lower Manhattan Development Corporation (LMDC) have overseen the reconstruction of the site as part of the new World Trade Center, following a master plan by Studio Daniel Libeskind. Developer Larry Silverstein holds the lease to retail and office space in four of the site's buildings.

Before the World Trade Center

The western portion of the World Trade Center site was originally under the Hudson River, with the shoreline in the vicinity of Greenwich Street. On this shoreline close to the intersection of Greenwich Street and the former Dey Street, Dutch explorer Adriaen Block's ship, the Tyger, burned to the waterline in November 1613, stranding Block and his crew and forcing them to overwinter on the island. The remains of the ship were buried under landfill when the shoreline was extended starting in 1797, and were discovered during excavation work in 1916. The remains of another ship from the eighteenth century were found in 2010 during excavation work at the site.

The area that was cleared for construction of the original World Trade Center complex was previously occupied by various electronics stores in what was called Radio Row. These streets and stores were demolished in the 1960s to make way for the World Trade Center.

Original buildings

At the time of their completion the "Twin Towers"—the original 1 World Trade Center (the North Tower), at 1,368 ft (417 metres), and 2 World Trade Center (the South Tower)—were the tallest buildings in the world. The other buildings in the complex included the Marriott World Trade Center (3 WTC), 4 WTC, 5 WTC, 6 WTC, and 7 WTC. All of these buildings were built between 1975 and 1985, with a construction cost of $400 million (equivalent to $ in  dollars). The complex was located in New York City's Financial District and contained  of office space.

September 11 attacks

On the morning of September 11, 2001, Islamist terrorists affiliated with Al-Qaeda hijacked American Airlines Flight 11 and United Airlines Flight 175, both of which were en route from Boston to Los Angeles, and intentionally crashed them into the two main towers of the World Trade Center. The towers collapsed within less than two hours of the collisions. 2,606 people, including 2,192 civilians, 343 firefighters, and 71 law enforcement officers who were in the towers and in the surrounding area died in the attacks, as well as 147 civilians and the 10 hijackers aboard the two airliners. After the collapse of the World Trade Center, hospital workers and law enforcement officers began referring to the World Trade Center site as "Ground Zero".

Debris and clean-up

The collapse of the towers spread dust across New York City and left hundreds of thousands of tons of debris at the site. To organize the cleanup and search for survivors and for human remains, the New York City Fire Department divided the disaster site into four sectors, each headed by its own chief. Cleanup workers trucked most of the building materials and debris from Ground Zero to Fresh Kills Landfill in Staten Island. Some people, such as those affiliated with World Trade Center Families for Proper Burial, were worried that human remains might also have been inadvertently transported to the landfill.

According to NIST, when WTC 1 (the North Tower) collapsed, falling debris struck 7 World Trade Center and ignited fires on multiple floors. The uncontrolled fires ultimately led to the progressive collapse of the structure.

Shortly after the attacks, the surrounding buildings were fitted with red mesh to prevent further damage. In November 2001, the remaining portions of Building 4 were leveled.

In December 2001, a temporary viewing platform at Fulton Street, between Church Street and Broadway, was opened to the public. That month, the last standing perimeter columns from the North Tower and the last remaining portions of Building 6 were removed.  Early estimates suggested that debris removal would take a year, but cleanup ended in May 2002, under budget and without a single serious injury. The Winter Garden Atrium was reopened to the public on September 17, 2002, the first major structure to be completely restored following the attacks.

Starting March 11, 2002, eighty-eight searchlights were installed and arranged to form two beams of light shooting straight up into the sky. This was called the Tribute in Light, and was originally lit every day at dusk until April 14, 2002. After that, the lights were lit on the second anniversary of the attack and have been lit on each subsequent September 11 since then. In February 2005, the New York City Medical Examiner's office ended its process of identifying human remains at the site.

In August 2008, New York City firefighters donated a cross made of steel from the World Trade Center to the Shanksville Volunteer Fire Company. The beam, mounted atop a platform shaped like the Pentagon, was erected outside the Shanksville firehouse near the crash site of United Airlines Flight 93.

Portions of the South Tower had also damaged the nearby Deutsche Bank Building, which soon became filled with toxic dust. By 2002, Deutsche Bank determined that its building was unsalvageable and it was scheduled for demolition. In January 2011, the demolition of the Deutsche Bank Building was completed.

Archaeology
In July 2010, a team of archaeologists at the site discovered the remains of a -long boat over 200 years old; it was probably made in the 18th century and dumped there along with wooden beams and trash in about 1810 to make up the land. The boat had been weighted to make it sink as part of foundations for a new pier. Samples of its wood have been taken for dendrochronology.

Ownership status
While the PANYNJ is often identified as the owner of the WTC site, the ownership situation was complicated after the September 11 attacks. The Port Authority did own a "significant" internal portion of the site of  but has acknowledged "ambiguities over ownership of miscellaneous strips of property at the World Trade Center site" going back to the 1960s. It was unclear who owned  of the site which is land where streets had been before the World Trade Center was built. In subsequent deals, the Port Authority gave some land to Larry Silverstein, including the land under 2 and 3 WTC in 2008.

Planning for the new World Trade Center

Soon after the September 11 attacks, Mayor Rudy Giuliani, Governor George Pataki, and President George W. Bush vowed to rebuild the World Trade Center site. On the day of the attacks, Giuliani proclaimed, "We will rebuild. We're going to come out of this stronger than before, politically stronger, economically stronger. The skyline will be made whole again." During a visit to the site on September 14, 2001, Bush spoke to a crowd of cleanup workers through a megaphone. An individual in the crowd shouted, "We can't hear you," to which Bush replied, "I can hear you. The rest of the world hears you. And the people who knocked these buildings down will hear all of us soon."

In a later address before Congress, the president declared, "As a symbol of America's resolve, my administration will work with Congress, and these two leaders, to show the world that we will rebuild New York City." The immediate response from World Trade Center leaseholder Larry Silverstein was that "it would be the tragedy of tragedies not to rebuild this part of New York. It would give the terrorists the victory they seek." However, by 2011, only one building, 7 World Trade Center, had been rebuilt. The buildings that have been rebuilt as of June 2018 include 7 World Trade Center, One World Trade Center, 4 World Trade Center, and 3 World Trade Center. The original twin towers took less than three years from start of construction to be finished and five years from the beginning planning stages. However, given the complexity and highly political nature of the rebuilding efforts, they are often cited as an example of a successful public-private collaboration and are taught as a case study in successful negotiations.

Early proposals for redesign

Lower Manhattan Development Corporation
Governor Pataki established the Lower Manhattan Development Corporation (LMDC) in November 2001, as an official commission to oversee the rebuilding process. The LMDC coordinates federal assistance in the rebuilding process, and works with the PANYNJ, Larry Silverstein, and Studio Daniel Libeskind, the master plan architect for the site's redesign. The corporation also handles communication with the local community, businesses, the city of New York, and relatives of victims of the September 11 attacks. A 16-member board of directors, half appointed by the governor and half by the mayor of New York, governs the LMDC.

The LMDC had questionable legal status regarding the restoration of the World Trade Center site, because the Port Authority owns most of the property and Larry Silverstein leased the World Trade Center's office space in July 2001. But the LMDC, in an April 2002 articulation of its principles for action, asserted its role in revitalizing lower Manhattan.

Directly after the attacks

In the months following the attacks, architects and urban planning experts held meetings and forums to discuss ideas for rebuilding the site. In January 2002, New York City art dealer Max Protetch solicited 50 concepts and renderings from artists and architects, which were put on exhibit in his Chelsea art gallery.

In April 2002, the LMDC sent out requests for proposals to redesign the World Trade Center site to 24 Manhattan architecture firms, but then soon withdrew them. The following month, the LMDC selected Beyer Blinder Belle as planner for the redesign of the World Trade Center site.

On July 16, 2002, Beyer Blinder Belle unveiled six concepts for redesigning the World Trade Center site. All six designs were voted "poor" by the roughly 5,000 New Yorkers that submitted feedback, so the LDMC announced a new, international, open-design study.

2002 World Trade Center site design competition

In an August 2002 press release, the LMDC announced a design study for the World Trade Center site. The following month, the LMDC, along with New York New Visions – a coalition of 21 architecture, engineering, planning, landscape architecture and design organizations – announced seven semifinalists. The following seven architecture firms were then invited to compete to be the master plan architect for the World Trade Center:
 Foster and Partners (Norman Foster)
 Studio Daniel Libeskind (Daniel Libeskind)
 Meier Eisenman Gwathmey Holl (Peter Eisenman, Richard Meier, Charles Gwathmey and Steven Holl), known as "The New York Five"
 Skidmore, Owings & Merrill
 THINK Team (Shigeru Ban, Frederic Schwartz, Ken Smith, Rafael Viñoly)
 United Architects
Peterson Littenberg, a small New York architecture firm, had been enlisted by the LMDC earlier that summer as a consultant, and was invited to participate as the seventh semifinalist.

The seven semifinalists presented their entries to the public on December 18, 2002, at the Winter Garden of the World Financial Center. In the following weeks, Skidmore, Owings & Merrill withdrew its entry from the competition.

Days before the announcement of the two finalists in February 2003, Larry Silverstein wrote to LMDC Chair John Whitehead to express his disapproval of all of the semifinalists' designs. As the Twin Towers' insurance money recipient, Silverstein claimed that he had the sole right to decide what would be built. He announced that he had already picked Skidmore, Owings & Merrill as his master planner for the site.

On February 1, 2003, the LMDC selected two finalists, the THINK Team and Studio Daniel Libeskind, and planned on picking a single winner by the end of the month. Rafael Viñoly of the THINK Team and Studio Daniel Libeskind presented their designs to the LMDC, which selected the THINK design. Earlier the same day, however, Roland Betts, a member of the LMDC, had called a meeting and the corporation had agreed to vote for the THINK design before hearing the final presentations. Governor Pataki, who had originally commissioned the LMDC, intervened and overruled the LMDC's decision. On February 27, 2003, Studio Daniel Libeskind officially won the competition to be the master planner for the World Trade Center redesign.

Libeskind's original proposal, which is titled Memory Foundations, underwent extensive revisions during collaboration with Larry Silverstein, and Skidmore, Owings & Merrill, whom Silverstein hired. Though Libeskind designed the site, the individual buildings have been designed by different architects. While not all of Liebeskind's ideas were incorporated into the final design, his design and the public support it garnered did solidify the principle that the original footprints of the Twin Towers should be turned into a memorial and not be used for commercial purposes.  As a result, Liebeskind's lawyers at the New York firm of Wachtell Lipton embarked on the multi-year negotiation process to frame a master plan for the rebuilding.  The first step in this process, completed in 2003, was the "swap" in which Silverstein gave up his rights to the footprints of the Twin Towers so that they could become a memorial, and in exchange received the right to build five new office towers around the memorial.  The "swap" and the ensuing negotiations, which lasted for many years, have been referred to as the most complex real estate transaction in human history because of the complexity of the issues involved, the many stakeholders, and the difficulty of reaching consensus.

Criticism of progress
An episode of CBS's 60 Minutes in 2010 focused on the lack of progress at Ground Zero, particularly on the lack of completion dates for a majority of the buildings, the main tower, One World Trade Center (previously known as the Freedom Tower)'s having undergone three different designs, and the delays and monetary expense involved.  Investor Larry Silverstein said the Port Authority's estimated completion date for the entire site was 2037, and billions of dollars had already been spent on the project, even though Ground Zero "is still a hole in the ground". During an interview for the episode, Larry Silverstein said: "I am the most frustrated person in the world...I'm seventy-eight years of age; I want to see this thing done in my lifetime".  However, it was noted that in early 2011, all five office towers of the World Trade Center had begun construction.

The social center of the old World Trade Center included a spectacular restaurant on the 107th Floor, called Windows on the World, and its Greatest Bar in the World; these were tourist attractions in their own right, and a social gathering spot for people who worked in the towers. This restaurant also housed one of the most prestigious wine schools in the United States, called "Windows on the World Wine School", run by wine personality Kevin Zraly. Despite numerous assurances that these local landmarks and global attractions would be rebuilt, the Port Authority scrapped plans to rebuild these WTC attractions, which has outraged some observers.

New structures
, the current structures on the site include:

Towers
One World Trade Center (previously coined the "Freedom Tower" by Governor Pataki) is the centerpiece of Libeskind's design. This height refers to 1776, the year in which the United States Declaration of Independence was signed. The tower was a collaboration between Studio Daniel Libeskind and Skidmore, Owings & Merrill architect David Childs. Childs acted as the design architect and project manager for the tower, and Daniel Libeskind collaborated on the concept and schematic design. The design was finalized in 2004, but was revised extensively after the NYPD raised security concerns, which delayed the start of the construction by two years. In 2006, the Port Authority took over from Silverstein Properties. The project's developer Tishman Construction Corporation was the construction manager at the time. Construction began in April 2006. Digging the foundation and installing tower-foundation steel columns, concrete, and rebar took twice as long as it normally would due to the existence of the subway line under West Broadway nearby. The building reached grade level by 2010, progressed at a pace of one floor a week, topped out in August 2012, and was structurally completed in May 2013. The building opened on November 3, 2014, and the first 170 employees of anchor tenant Conde Nast began their work there.

Danish architect Bjarke Ingels designed Two World Trade Center, also known as 200 Greenwich Street. The building's gardens integrate Tribeca with the Financial District at the World Trade Center. As part of a 2010 lease deal to finance 4 WTC, there were plans to build 2 and 3 World Trade Center to ground level. Construction of everything up to street level was completed in mid-2013. The rest of the building, however, has yet to be built until tenants for Tower 2 can be found.

Richard Rogers Partnership designed Three World Trade Center, or 175 Greenwich Street, which stands across Greenwich Street from the Memorial's two reflecting pools. Groundbreaking occurred in fall 2008, and in May 2009, the Port Authority proposed reducing the tower to four stories. In 2012, with Silverstein still unable to find tenants, construction on the above-ground levels was delayed indefinitely, with plans for only 7 stories. However, work progressed on below-grade foundations and the ground-level podium, which was completed by October 2013. Anchor tenant Group M was finally signed in late 2013, but finance negotiations between Silverstein Properties and the Port Authority dragged, until an agreement was reached in June 2014. Construction resumed in August 2014, and the building opened on June 11, 2018.

Maki and Associates designed Four World Trade Center, also known as 150 Greenwich Street. Construction started in 2008, and the steel skeleton was mostly complete by 2012. The building opened in November 2013, making it the second tower on the site to open behind 7 World Trade Center, as well as the first building on the Port Authority property.

Five World Trade Center was designed by Kohn Pedersen Fox and will stand where the Deutsche Bank Building once stood. On June 22, 2007, the Port Authority announced that JP Morgan Chase will lease the 42-story building for its investment banking headquarters; however, JPMorgan's March 2008 acquisition of Bear Stearns had caused construction to stagnate, as the company changed its plans and relocated its headquarters to 383 Madison Avenue. Construction began on September 9, 2011. Although the foundation was completed, construction on the main structure never commenced.

7 World Trade Center stands off of Port Authority property. David Childs of Skidmore, Owings & Merrill designed the tower. Construction of the new  Trade Center began in 2002 and the building opened on May 23, 2006, achieving LEED gold status and being the first tower in the complex to reopen.

Memorial and museum

Construction of the memorial was completed by early 2011. The memorial opened on September 11, 2011, coinciding with the 10th anniversary of the attacks. The museum was initially scheduled to open on September 11, 2012, one year after the opening of the memorial. However, construction was halted in December 2011 due to financial disputes between the Port Authority of New York and New Jersey and the National September 11 Memorial and Museum Foundation, deciding on who should be responsible for infrastructure costs. Those disputes were resolved and construction resumed on September 10, 2012.  Further delays were caused when Hurricane Sandy significantly damaged the site in November 2012. The museum was completed  and opened to families of the victims on May 15, 2014 and opened to the general public on May 21, 2014.

Retail space

In early December 2013, Australian retail corporation Westfield announced that it will invest US$800 million for complete control of the retail space at the rebuilt center. Westfield purchased the Port Authority of New York and New Jersey's 50 percent stake in the retail part of the World Trade Center site, increasing its total investment to more than US$1.4 billion.

Transportation Hub

A temporary PATH station opened in 2003 and construction on the permanent station was supposed to begin in fall 2004; however, the NYPD raised security concerns on the entire site. Among the revisions effecting the Transportation Hub was doubling the number of support columns. In the original plan, the construction of the 9/11 Memorial and Museum was only supposed to have begun after the Transportation Hub had been completed because the roof of the Transportation Hub provided the foundation on which the Memorial rested upon and the walls of the Museum. Due to the two-year delay and pressure by the victims' families to have the Memorial completed by the 10th anniversary, it was decided to concentrate on building the Memorial and holding off construction of the Transportation Hub, which increased costs. Construction finally began on the Transportation Hub in 2010. The hub formally opened on March 3, 2016, several years behind schedule and billions of dollars over budget.

Performing Arts Center

Liberty Park and constituent structures

Fiterman Hall

Exclusive ZIP code

The World Trade Center site used the ZIP code 10048 before the September 11 attacks, and there were eight letter carriers assigned to the buildings to deliver mail to the buildings' tenants. All of the Postal Service employees survived the attacks. In the months following the September 11, 2001 attacks, over 80,000 pieces of mail continued to arrive each day addressed to the World Trade Center, including some items loosely addressed to such recipients as "The Search Dogs" or "The Rescuers". By 2003, 3,600 items of mail per day were still being sent to 10048.  These items were processed at the James A. Farley General Post Office, the main facility for New York City, located across from Penn Station in Midtown Manhattan.  Mail there was held for pick-up by messenger, forwarded to the intended recipient, returned to its sender, or destroyed.

Following the attacks, the United States Postal Service provided free mail-forwarding service to the WTC's former occupants for three years, rather than the usual one-year period.  By the end of 2006, the number of items sent to 10048 had decreased to around 300 items daily, mostly sent from businesses and organizations that had not yet updated their bulk mailing lists.

The 90 Church Street Station Post Office building is located adjacent to the new World Trade Center and the PATH station, and serves the ZIP code of 10007, which is assigned to the surrounding Tribeca neighborhood. The new World Trade Center does not use the ZIP code 10048; rather, it has been integrated within the existing 10007 ZIP code. The 10048 ZIP code was used again after the September 11, 2001 attacks for a pictorial cancellation commemorating the anniversary of the attacks.

See also

 Collapse of the World Trade Center
 Construction of One World Trade Center
 Health effects arising from the September 11 attacks
 Survivors' Staircase
 Verizon Building

References

External links

 
 Reviving Ground Zero – interactive slideshow with audio by The New York Times

Organizations:
 Project Rebirth
 World Trade Center Rising 
 RebuildGroundZero, a community project based on Ground Zero's rebuilding

Buildings and structures under construction in the United States
Mosque-related controversies

Aftermath of the September 11 attacks
Daniel Libeskind designs
September 11 attacks